Jérémie Boutherin (born  in Grenoble) is a French bobsledder.

Boutherin competed at the 2014 Winter Olympics for France. He teamed with driver Thibault Godefroy, Vincent Ricard and Jérémy Baillard as the France-2 sled in the four-man event, finishing 23rd.
As of April 2014, his best showing at the World Championships is 24th, coming in the four-man event in 2013.

Boutherin made his World Cup debut in January 2013. As of April 2014, his best finish is 10th, in a four-man event in 2012–13 at Altenberg.

References

1988 births
Living people
Olympic bobsledders of France
Sportspeople from Grenoble
Bobsledders at the 2014 Winter Olympics
French male bobsledders